This article lists the complete discography of Steve Lukather.

Albums

Studio albums

Live albums

Singles

Videos

With Toto

As sideman or guest

With Herb Alpert
 Magic Man (A&M, 1981)
 Blow Your Own Horn (A&M, 1983)

With America
 Alibi (Capitol, 1980)
 View from the Ground (Capitol, 1982)

With Carole Bayer Sager
 ...Too (Elektra, 1978)
 Sometimes Late at Night (Boardwalk, 1981)

With George Benson
 Songs and Stories (Concord Records, 2009)

With Michael Bolton
 Soul Provider (Columbia, 1989)
 Timeless: The Classics Vol. 2 (Columbia Records, 1999)

With Terence Boylan
 Terence Boylan (Asylum, 1977)

With Larry Carlton
 No Substitutions: Live in Osaka (Favored Nations, 2001)
 The Paris Concert (335, 2009)
 At Blue Note Tokyo (335, 2016)

With Bill Champlin
 Single (Full Moon, 1978)
 Runaway (Elektra, 1981)
 Burn Down the Night (Emotion, 1992)
 Through It All (Turnip The Music Group, 1994)
 No Place Left To Fall (DreamMakers Music, 2008)

With Cher
 Take Me Home (Casablanca, 1979)
 Prisoner (Casablanca, 1979)
 I Paralyze (Columbia, 1982)
 Cher (Geffen, 1987)
 Heart of Stone (Geffen, 1989)
 Love Hurts (Geffen, 1991)

With Chicago
 Chicago 16 (Warner Bros., 1982)
 Chicago 18 (Warner Bros., 1986)

With Joe Cocker
 Civilized Man (Capitol, 1984)
 Heart & Soul (EMI, 2004)

With Alice Cooper
 From the Inside (Warner Bros., 1978)
 Trash (Epic, 1989)

With Randy Crawford
 Secret Combination (Warner Bros., 1981)
 Windsong (Warner Bros., 1982)
 Nightline (Warner Bros., 1983)

With Peter Criss
 Peter Criss (Casablanca, 1978)
 Out of Control (Casablanca, 1980)
 Let Me Rock You (Casablanca, 1982)

With Dalbello
 Lisa Dal Bello (MCA, 1977)
 Pretty Girls (Talisman, 1979)

With Neil Diamond
 Headed for the Future (Columbia, 1986)
 The Best Years of Our Lives (CBS, 1988)

With Charlie Dore
 Listen! (Chrysalis Records, 1981)

With Earth, Wind & Fire
 I Am (Columbia, 1979)
 Faces (Columbia, 1980)

With Aretha Franklin
 Aretha (Arista, 1980)
 Love All the Hurt Away (Arista, 1981)

With Ted Gärdestad
 Blue Virgin Isles (Polar, 1978)

With Randy Goodrum
 Caretaker of Dreams (Polydor, 1991)
 Words and Music (Polydor, 1994)
 Songbook (Beverly, 1995)

With Michael Jackson
 Thriller (Epic, 1982)

With Elton John
 Victim of Love (MCA, 1979)
 21 at 33 (Rocket, 1980)
 The Fox (Rocket, 1981)

With Quincy Jones
 The Dude (A&M, 1981)
 Back on the Block (Qwest, 1989)

With Rickie Lee Jones
 Pirates (Warner Bros., 1981)
 The Magazine (Warner Bros., 1984)

With Marc Jordan
 Mannequin (Warner Bros., 1978)
 Blue Desert (Warner Bros., 1979)
 A Hole in the Wall (Sound Design, 1993)

With Leah Kunkel
 Leah Kunkel (Columbia, 1979)
 I Run With Trouble (Columbia, 1980)

With Kenny Loggins
 High Adventure (Columbia, 1982)
 Vox Humana (Columbia, 1985)

With Cheryl Lynn
 Cheryl Lynn (Columbia, 1978)
 Start Over (Manhattan Records, 1987)

With Melissa Manchester
 Hey Ricky (Arista, 1982)
 Mathematics (MCA Records, 1985)

With The Manhattan Transfer
 Extensions (Atlantic, 1979)
 Mecca for Moderns (Atlantic, 1981)

With Richard Marx
 Repeat Offender (EMI, 1989)
 Rush Street (Capitol, 1991)
 Flesh and Bone (Capitol, 1997)

With Michael McDonald
 If That's What It Takes (Warner Bros., 1982)
 No Lookin' Back (Warner Bros., 1986)

With Mary MacGregor
 Mary MacGregor (RSO Records, 1980)

With Adam Mitchell
 Redhead in Trouble (Asylum, 1979)

With Joni Mitchell
 Wild Things Run Fast (Geffen, 1982)
 Dog Eat Dog (Geffen, 1985)

With Olivia Newton-John
 Totally Hot (MCA, 1978)
 Physical (EMI, 1981)
 Soul Kiss (Mercury, 1985)

With Randy Newman
 Trouble in Paradise (Warner Bros., 1983)
 Land of Dreams (Reprise, 1988)

With Kenny Nolan
 A Song Between Us (Polydor, 1978)

With Lionel Richie
 Can't Slow Down (Motown, 1983)
 Dancing on the Ceiling (Sonolux, 1985)
 Louder Than Words (Mercury, 1996)

With Lee Ritenour
 Feel the Night (Elektra, 1979)
 6 String Theory (Concord, 2010)

With Kenny Rogers
 We've Got Tonight (Liberty, 1983)
 The Heart of the Matter (RCA, 1985)
 They Don't Make Them Like They Used To (RCA, 1986)

With Diana Ross
 Baby It's Me (Motown, 1977)
 Ross (RCA, 1983)

With Leo Sayer
 Leo Sayer (Chrysalis, 1978)
 Here (Warner Bros., 1979)
 World Radio (Warner Bros., 1982)
 Have You Ever Been in Love (Chrysalis, 1983)

With Boz Scaggs
 Down Two Then Left (Columbia, 1977)
 Middle Man (CBS, 1980)
 Other Roads (Columbia, 1988)
 Dig (Virgin, 2001)

With Derek Sherinian
 Inertia (Inside Out, 2001)
 Black Utopia (Inside Out, 2003)
 Mythology (Inside Out, 2004)
 Oceana (Music Theories, 2011)
 Vortex (Inside Out, 2022)

With Ringo Starr
 Postcards from Paradise (Universal Music Enterprises, 2015)
 Give More Love (Universal Music Enterprises, 2017)
 What's My Name (Universal Music Enterprises, 2019)
 Zoom In (UMe, 2021)
 Change the World (UMe, 2021)
 EP3 (UMe, 2022)

With Barbra Streisand
 Songbird (Columbia, 1978)
 Wet (Columbia, 1979)

With Donna Summer
 The Wanderer (Geffen, 1980)
 Donna Summer (Geffen, 1982)

With Tavares
 Supercharged (Capitol, 1980)

With Fee Waybill and The Tubes
 The Completion Backward Principle (Capitol, 1981)
 Outside Inside (Capitol, 1983)
 Read My Lips (Capitol, 1984)
 Don't Be Scared by These Hands (Westcoast, 1996)

With Jimmy Webb
 Angel Heart (Sony, 1982)
 Suspending Disbelief (Elektra Records, 1993)

With Deniece Williams
 When Love Comes Calling (Columbia Records, 1978)

With Joseph Williams
 Joseph Williams (MCA, 1982)
 3 (Kitty Records, 1997)
 This Fall (WHD Entertainment, Inc., 2008)
 Denizen Tenant (The Players Club, 2021)

With Wilson Phillips
 Wilson Phillips (SBK, 1990)
 Shadows and Light (SBK, 1992)

With Jesse Colin Young
 The Perfect Stranger (Elektra, 1982)

With others
 Peter Allen, Bi-Coastal (A&M, 1980)
 Jon Anderson, In the City of Angels (CBS, 1988)
 Paul Anka, Walk a Fine Line (Columbia, 1983)
 Chet Atkins, Stay Tuned (Columbia, 1985)
 Patti Austin, Every Home Should Have One (Qwest, 1981)
 Stephen Bishop, Bowling in Paris (Atlantic, 1989)
 Gregg Bissonette, Siblings (Dogs in Space, 1992)
 Laura Branigan, Branigan (Atlantic, 1982)
 The Brothers Johnson, Winners (A&M, 1981)
 Jackson Browne, Lives in the Balance (Asylum, 1986)
 Belinda Carlisle, Runaway Horses (Virgin, 1989)
 Eric Carmen, Tonight You're Mine (Arista Records, 1980)
 Kim Carnes, Café Racers (EMI, 1983)
 Lenny Castro, Hands of Silk and Stone (2018)
 Peter Cetera, Peter Cetera (Warner Bros. Records, 1981)
 Char, U.S.J (Pony Canyon, 1981)
 Desmond Child, Discipline (Elektra Records, 1991)
 Eric Clapton, Behind the Sun (Warner Bros., 1985)
 Clarence Clemons, A Night with Mr. C (Legacy, 2016)
 Jimmy Cliff, Give Thankx (Warner Bros., 1978)
 Rosemary Clooney, Still on the Road (Concord Jazz, 1994)
 David Crosby, Oh Yes I Can (A&M, 1989)
 Christopher Cross, Another Page (Warner Bros., 1983)
 The Crusaders, Healing the Wounds (GRP, 1991)
 Sheena Easton, A Private Heaven (EMI, 1984)
 David Essex, Be-Bop the Future (Mercury, 1981)
 Eye to Eye, Shakespeare Stole My Baby (Warner Bros., 1983)
 Lara Fabian, Lara Fabian (Epic Records, 2000)
 Don Felder, Road to Forever (Top Ten, 2012)
 David Foster, River of Love (Atlantic, 1990)
 Peter Frampton, Breaking All the Rules (A&M, 1981)
 Art Garfunkel, Lefty (CBS, 1988)
 Gilberto Gil, Realce (WEA/Elektra, 1979)
 Louise Goffin, Kid Blue (Asylum, 1979)
 Tony Hadley, The State of Play (EMI, 1992)
 Hall & Oates, Along the Red Ledge (RCA, 1978)
 Herbie Hancock, Lite Me Up (CBS, 1982)
 Don Henley, I Can't Stand Still (Asylum, 1982)
 David Hungate, Souvenir (Clubhouse, 1994)
 The Jacksons, Victory (Epic, 1984)
 Al Jarreau, Breakin' Away (Warner Bros., 1981)
 Booker T. Jones, The Runaway (MCA, 1989)
 Naoko Kawai, 9 ½ NINE HALF (Nippon Columbia, 1985)
 Chaka Khan, I Feel for You (Warner Bros., 1984)
 Greg Lake, Greg Lake (Chrysalis, 1981)
 Rita Lee, Bombom (Som Livre, 1983)
 Tony Levin, Resonator (Narada, 2006)
 Harvey Mason, Groovin' You (Arista, 1979)
 John Mayall, Bottom Line (DJM, 1979)
 Meat Loaf, Live Around the World (Tommy Boy, 1996)
 Ronnie Milsap, Heart & Soul (RCA, 1987)
 Graham Nash, Earth & Sky (Capitol, 1980)
 Stevie Nicks, The Wild Heart (Modern, 1983)
 Nielsen/Pearson, Nielsen/Pearson (Capitol, 1983)
 Ozzy Osbourne, Prince of Darkness (Epic, 2005)
 David Paich, Forgotten Toys (The Players Club, 2022)
 Steve Porcaro, Someday/Somehow (Porcara, 2016)
 Billy Preston, The Way I Am (Motown, 1981)
 Helen Reddy, We'll Sing in the Sunshine (Capitol, 1978)
 Brenda Russell, Love Life (A&M Records, 1981)
 Timothy B. Schmit, Playin' It Cool (Asylum, 1984)
 Bob Seger, The Fire Inside (Capitol, 1991)
 Spinal Tap, Break Like the Wind (MCA, 1992)
 Rod Stewart, Vagabond Heart (Warner Bros., 1991)
 Bernie Taupin, He Who Rides the Tiger (Elektra Records, 1980)
 Leon Ware, Leon Ware (Atlantic Records, 1982)
 Dionne Warwick, Friends in Love (Arista Records, 1982)
 Roger Waters, Amused to Death (Columbia, 1992)
 Ernie Watts, Chariots of Fire (Wounded Bird, 2005)
 Tim Weisberg, Outrageous Temptations (Cypress, 1989)
 Leslie West, Unusual Suspects (Provogue, 2011)
 John Wetton, Voice Mail/Battle Lines (Eclipse, 1994)
 Gary Wright, Headin' Home (Warner Bros., 1979)
 Syreeta Wright, Syreeta (Motown, 1980)
 Warren Zevon, The Envoy (Asylum, 1982)

Notes

References

External links
 Official discography of Steve Lukather

Discographies of American artists
Jazz discographies
Rock music discographies